Denin is a surname. Notable people with the surname include:

Kate Denin (1837–1907), American stage actress
Nikolay Denin (born 1958), Russian governor 
Susan Denin (1835–1875), American stage actress, sister of Kate

See also
Donin